Michael John Driscoll (born 27 October 1950, Warrington) is an economist, sometime Chair of the Coalition of Modern Universities in the UK and from 1996 to 2015 was Vice-Chancellor of Middlesex University in London. In 2016, he was appointed President and Vice-Chancellor of Taylor's University in Malaysia.

Early life
Driscoll was born and brought up in Warrington. From Trent Polytechnic, he obtained a BA in Economics.

Career
He lectured in Economics at the University of Birmingham from 1977-1989. He spent three years during this period on secondments at the OECD in Paris. From 1989-91 he was Head of Economics at Middlesex University.

He was Chairman of the Coalition of Modern Universities from 2003-2007 (became Million+ in 2004).

References

1950 births
Living people
British economists
Vice-Chancellors of Middlesex University
People educated at Boteler Grammar School
People from Warrington
Alumni of Nottingham Trent University
Academics of the University of Birmingham
Academics of Middlesex University